Frank Owen Gehry, FAIA (born ) is a Canadian-born American architect and designer. A number of his buildings, including his private residence in Santa Monica, California, have become world-renowned attractions.

His works are considered among the most important of contemporary architecture in the 2010 World Architecture Survey, leading Vanity Fair to call him "the most important architect of our age". He is also the designer of the National Dwight D. Eisenhower Memorial.

Early life

Gehry was born Frank Owen Goldberg on February 28, 1929, in Toronto, Ontario, to parents Sadie Thelma (née Kaplanski/Caplan) and Irving Goldberg. His father was born in Brooklyn, New York, to Russian Jewish parents, and his mother was a Polish Jewish immigrant born in Łódź. A creative child, he was encouraged by his grandmother, Leah Caplan, with whom he built little cities out of scraps of wood. With these scraps from her husband's hardware store, she entertained him for hours, building imaginary houses and futuristic cities on the living room floor.

Gehry's use of corrugated steel, chain-link fencing, unpainted plywood, and other utilitarian or "everyday" materials was partly inspired by spending Saturday mornings at his grandfather's hardware store. He spent time drawing with his father, and his mother introduced him to the world of art. "So the creative genes were there", Gehry says. "But my father thought I was a dreamer, I wasn't gonna amount to anything. It was my mother who thought I was just reticent to do things. She would push me."

He was given the Hebrew name "Ephraim" by his grandfather, but used it only at his bar mitzvah.

Education
In 1947, Gehry's family immigrated to the United States, settling in California. He got a job driving a delivery truck and studied at Los Angeles City College. He went on to graduate from the University of Southern California's School of Architecture. During that time, he became a member of Alpha Epsilon Pi.

According to Gehry, "I was a truck driver in L.A., going to City College, and I tried radio announcing, which I wasn't very good at. I tried chemical engineering, which I wasn't very good at and didn't like, and then I remembered. You know, somehow I just started wracking my brain about, 'What do I like?' Where was I? What made me excited? And I remembered art, that I loved going to museums and I loved looking at paintings, loved listening to music. Those things came from my mother, who took me to concerts and museums. I remembered Grandma and the blocks, and just on a hunch, I tried some architecture classes." Gehry graduated with a Bachelor of Architecture degree from the University of Southern California  in 1954.

He then spent time away from architecture in numerous other jobs, including service in the United States Army. In the fall of 1956, he moved his family to Cambridge, where he studied city planning at the Harvard Graduate School of Design. He left before completing the program, disheartened and "underwhelmed". His progressive ideas about socially responsible architecture were under-realized, and the final straw occurred when he sat in on a discussion of one professor's "secret project in progress"—a palace that he was designing for right-wing Cuban dictator Fulgencio Batista (1901–1973).

Career

Gehry returned to Los Angeles to work for Victor Gruen Associates, with whom he had apprenticed while at USC. In 1957, at age 28, he was given the chance to design his first private residence with friend and old classmate Greg Walsh. Construction was done by another neighbor across the street from his wife's family, Charlie Sockler. Built in Idyllwild, California for his wife Anita's family neighbor Melvin David, the over  "David Cabin" shows features that were to become synonymous with Gehry's later work, including beams protruding from the exterior sides, vertical-grain douglas fir detail, and exposed unfinished ceiling beams. It also shows strong Asian influences, stemming from his earliest inspirations, such as the Shosoin Treasure House in Nara, Japan.

In 1961, Gehry moved to Paris, where he worked for architect Andre Remondet. In 1962, he established a practice in Los Angeles that became Frank Gehry and Associates in 1967, then Gehry Partners in 2001. His earliest commissions were in Southern California, where he designed a number of innovative commercial structures such as Santa Monica Place (1980) and residential buildings such as the eccentric Norton House (1984) in Venice, California.

Among these works, Gehry's most notable design may be the renovation of his own Santa Monica residence. Originally built in 1920 and purchased by Gehry in 1977, it features a metallic exterior wrapped around the original building that leaves many of the original details visible. Gehry still resides there.

Other of Gehry's buildings completed during the 1980s include the Cabrillo Marine Aquarium (1981) in San Pedro, and the California Aerospace Museum (1984) at the California Museum of Science and Industry in Los Angeles.

In 1989, Gehry received the Pritzker Architecture Prize, where the jury described him: "Always open to experimentation, he has as well a sureness and maturity that resists, in the same way that Picasso did, being bound either by critical acceptance or his successes. His buildings are juxtaposed collages of spaces and materials that make users appreciative of both the theatre and the back-stage, simultaneously revealed."

Gehry continued to design other notable buildings in California, such as the Chiat/Day Building (1991) in Venice, in collaboration with Claes Oldenburg, which is well known for its massive sculpture of binoculars. He also began receiving larger national and international commissions, including his first European commission, the Vitra International Furniture Manufacturing Facility and Design Museum in Germany, completed in 1989. It was soon followed by other major commissions including the Frederick Weisman Museum of Art (1993) in Minneapolis, Minnesota; the Cinémathèque Française (1994) in Paris; and the Dancing House (1996) in Prague.

From 1994 to 1996 a couple buildings by Gehry for a Public housing project were realized in Goldstein, part of Frankfurt-Schwanheim (1994)
In 1997, Gehry vaulted to a new level of international acclaim when the Guggenheim Museum Bilbao opened in Bilbao, Spain. Hailed by The New Yorker as a "masterpiece of the 20th century", and by legendary architect Philip Johnson as "the greatest building of our time", the museum became famous for its striking yet aesthetically pleasing design and its positive economic effect on the city.

Since then, Gehry has regularly won major commissions and established himself as one of the world's most notable architects. His best-received works include several concert halls for classical music. The boisterous, curvaceous Walt Disney Concert Hall (2003) in downtown Los Angeles is the centerpiece of the neighborhood's revitalization; the Los Angeles Times called it "the most effective answer to doubters, naysayers, and grumbling critics an American architect has ever produced". Gehry also designed the open-air Jay Pritzker Pavilion (2004) in Chicago's Millennium Park; and the understated New World Center (2011) in Miami Beach, which the LA Times called "a piece of architecture that dares you to underestimate it or write it off at first glance."

His other notable works include academic buildings such as the Stata Center (2004) at MIT, and the Peter B. Lewis Library (2008) at Princeton University; museums such as the Museum of Pop Culture (2000) in Seattle, Washington; commercial buildings such as the IAC Building (2007) in New York City; and residential buildings, such as Gehry's first skyscraper, the Beekman Tower at 8 Spruce Street (2011) in New York City.

Gehry's recent major international works include the Dr Chau Chak Wing Building at the University of Technology Sydney, completed in 2014, and the Chau Chak Wing, with its 320,000 bricks in "sweeping lines", described as "10 out of 10" on a scale of difficulty. An ongoing project is the Guggenheim Abu Dhabi on Saadiyat Island in the United Arab Emirates. Other significant projects such as the Mirvish Towers in Toronto, and a multi-decade renovation of the Philadelphia Museum of Art, are currently in the design stage. In October 2013, Gehry was appointed joint architect with Foster + Partners to design the High Street phase of the development of Battersea Power Station in London, Gehry's first project there.

In recent years, some of Gehry's more prominent designs have failed to go forward. In addition to unrealized designs for the Corcoran Art Gallery expansion in Washington, DC, and a new Guggenheim museum near the South Street Seaport in New York City, Gehry was notoriously dropped by developer Bruce Ratner from the Pacific Park (Brooklyn) redevelopment project, and in 2014 as the designer of the World Trade Center Performing Arts Center in New York City. Some stalled projects have recently shown progress: After many years and a dismissal, Gehry was recently reinstated as architect for the Grand Avenue Project in Los Angeles, and though his controversial
 design of the National Dwight D. Eisenhower Memorial in Washington, DC has had numerous delays during the approval process with the United States Congress, it was finally approved in 2014 with a modified design.

In 2014, two significant, long-awaited museums designed by Gehry opened: the Biomuseo, a biodiversity museum in Panama City, Panama; and the Fondation Louis Vuitton, a modern art museum in the Bois de Boulogne park in Paris, France, which opened to some rave reviews.

Also in 2014, Gehry was commissioned by River LA (formerly the Los Angeles River Revitalization Corporation), a nonprofit group founded by the city of Los Angeles in 2009 to coordinate river policy, to devise a wide-ranging new plan for the river.

In February 2015, the new AU$180 million building for the University of Technology Sydney was officially opened, whose façade has more than 320,000 hand-placed bricks and glass slabs. Gehry said he would not design a building like the "crumpled paper bag" again.

Gehry told the French newspaper La Croix in November 2016 that President of France François Hollande had assured him he could relocate to France if Donald Trump was elected President of the United States. The following month, Gehry said that he had no plans to move. Trump and he exchanged words in 2010 when Gehry's 8 Spruce Street, originally known as Beekman Tower, was built  taller than the nearby Trump Building, which until then was New York City's tallest residential building.

Notable Gehry-designed buildings completed in the 2020s include the Dwight D. Eisenhower Memorial in Washington, DC and the LUMA Arles museum in France. In 2021, noting Gehry's progress on an increasing number of significant projects in his hometown, including the Grand Avenue Project, a concert hall for the Youth Orchestra Los Angeles, and an office building for Warner Bros., The Architect's Newspaper stated that "Seventy-four years after he moved there from his native Toronto, L.A. is looking more and more like Gehry Country."

Architectural style
Said to "defy categorisation", Gehry's work reflects a spirit of experimentation coupled with a respect for the demands of professional practice, and has remained largely unaligned with broader stylistic tendencies or movements. With his earliest educational influences rooted in modernism, Gehry's work has sought to escape modernist stylistic tropes while remaining interested in some of its underlying transformative agendas. Continually working between given circumstances and unanticipated materializations, he has been assessed as someone who "made us produce buildings that are fun, sculpturally exciting, good experiences", although his approach may become "less relevant as pressure mounts to do more with less".

Gehry's style at times seems unfinished or even crude, but his work is consistent with the California "funk" art movement of the 1960s and early 1970s, which featured the use of inexpensive found objects and nontraditional media such as clay to make serious art. His works always have at least some element of deconstructivism; he has been called "the apostle of chain-link fencing and corrugated metal siding". However, a retrospective exhibit at New York's Whitney Museum in 1988 revealed that he is also a sophisticated classical artist who knows European art history and contemporary sculpture and painting.

Gallery

Bilbao effect

After the phenomenal success of Gehry's design for the Guggenheim Museum in Bilbao, Spain, critics began referring to the economic and cultural revitalization of cities through iconic, innovative architecture as the "Bilbao effect". In the first 12 months after the museum was opened, an estimated US$160 million were added to the Basque economy. Indeed, over $3.5 billion have been added to the Basque economy since the building opened. In subsequent years there have been many attempts to replicate this effect through large-scale eye-catching architectural commissions that have been both successful and unsuccessful, such as Daniel Libeskind's expansion of the Denver Art Museum and buildings by Gehry himself, such as the almost universally well-received Walt Disney Concert Hall in Los Angeles and the more controversial Museum of Pop Culture in Seattle. Though some link the concept of the Bilbao effect to the notion of starchitecture, Gehry has consistently rejected the label of a starchitect.

Criticism
Though much of Gehry's work has been well-received, its reception was not always positive. Art historian Hal Foster reads Gehry's architecture as, primarily, in the service of corporate branding. Criticism of his work includes complaints over design flaws that the buildings waste structural resources by creating functionless forms, do not seem to belong in their surroundings or enhance the public context of their locations, and are apparently designed without taking into account the local climate.

Moreover, socialist magazine Jacobin pointed out that Gehry's work can be summed up as architecture for the super-wealthy, in the sense that it is expensive, not resourceful, and does not serve the interests of the overwhelming majority. The article criticized Gehry's statement, "In the world we live in, 98 percent of what gets built and designed today is pure shit."

Other aspects of career

Academia
In January 2011, Gehry joined the University of Southern California (USC) faculty, as the Judge Widney Professor of Architecture. He has since continued in this role at his alma mater. He has also held teaching positions at Harvard University, the University of California at Los Angeles, the University of Toronto, Columbia University, the Federal Institute of Technology in Zurich, and at Yale University, where he still teaches as of 2017.

Though he is often referred to as a "starchitect", he has repeatedly expressed his disdain for the term, insisting he is only an architect. Steve Sample, President of the University of Southern California, told Gehry that "...After George Lucas, you are our most prominent graduate".

, Gehry has received over a dozen honorary university degrees (see #Honorary doctorates).

In February 2017, MasterClass announced an online architecture course taught by Gehry that was released that July.

Exhibition design
Gehry has been involved in exhibition designs at the Los Angeles County Museum of Art dating back to the 1960s. In 1965, Gehry designed the exhibition display for the "Art Treasures of Japan" exhibition at the LACMA. This was followed soon after by the exhibition design for the "Assyrian Reliefs" show in 1966 and the "Billy Al Bengston Retrospective" in 1968. The LACMA then had Gehry design the installation for the "Treasures of Tutankhamen" exhibition in 1978 followed by the "Avant-Garde in Russia 1910–1930" exhibition in 1980. The subsequent year, Gehry designed the exhibition for "Seventeen Artists in the '60s" at the LACMA, followed soon after by the "German Expressionist Sculpture Exhibition" in 1983. In 1991–92, Gehry designed the installation of the landmark exhibition "Degenerate Art: The Fate of the Avant-Garde in Nazi Germany", which opened at the Los Angeles County Museum of Art and traveled to the Art Institute of Chicago, the Smithsonian Institution in Washington, and the Altes Museum in Berlin. Gehry was asked to design an exhibition on the work of Alexander Calder at the Los Angeles County Museum of Art's Resnick Pavilion, again invited by the museum's curator Stephanie Barron. The exhibition began on November 24, 2013, and ran through July 27, 2014.

In addition to his long-standing involvement with exhibition design at the LACMA, Gehry has also designed numerous exhibition installations with other institutions. In 1998, "The Art of the Motorcycle" exhibition opened at the Solomon R. Guggenheim Museum with its installation designed by Gehry. This exhibition subsequently traveled to the Field Museum of Natural History in Chicago, the Guggenheim Museum in Bilbao and the Guggenheim Las Vegas.

In 2014, he curated an exhibition of photography by his close friend and businessman Peter Arnell that ran from March 5 through April 1 at Milk Studios Gallery in Los Angeles.

Stage design
In 1983, Gehry created the stage design for Lucinda Childs' dance Available Light, set to music by John Adams. It premiered at the Museum of Contemporary Art, Los Angeles at the "Temporary Contemporary", and was subsequently seen at the Brooklyn Academy of Music Opera House in New York City and the Theatre de la Ville in Paris. The set consisted of two levels angled in relation to each other, with a chain-link backdrop. The piece was revived in 2015, and was performed, among other places, in Los Angeles and Philadelphia, where it was presented by FringeArts, which commissioned the revival.

In 2012, Gehry designed the set for the Los Angeles Philharmonic's opera production of Don Giovanni, performed at the Walt Disney Concert Hall.

In April 2014, Gehry designed a set for an "exploration of the life and career of Pierre Boulez" by the Chicago Symphony Orchestra, which was performed in November of that year.

Other designs

In addition to architecture, Gehry has made a line of furniture for Knoll and for Heller Furniture, jewelry for Tiffany & Co., various household items, sculptures, and even a glass bottle for Wyborowa Vodka. His first line of furniture, produced from 1969 to 1973, was called "Easy Edges", constructed out of cardboard. Another line of furniture released in the spring of 1992 is "Bentwood Furniture". Each piece is named after a different hockey term. He was first introduced to making furniture in 1954 while serving in the U.S. Army, where he designed furniture for the enlisted soldiers.

In many of his designs, Gehry is inspired by fish. "It was by accident I got into the fish image", claimed Gehry. One thing that sparked his interest in fish was the fact that his colleagues were recreating Greek temples. He said, "Three hundred million years before man was fish....if you gotta go back, and you're insecure about going forward...go back three hundred million years ago. Why are you stopping at the Greeks? So, I started drawing fish in my sketchbook, and then I started to realize that there was something in it."

As a result of his fascination, the first Fish Lamps were fabricated between 1984 and 1986. They employed wire armatures molded into fish shapes, onto which shards of plastic laminate ColorCore are individually glued. Since the creation of the first lamp in 1984, the fish has become a recurrent motif in Gehry's work, most notably in the Fish Sculpture at La Vila Olímpica del Poblenou in Barcelona (1989–92) and Standing Glass Fish for the Minneapolis Sculpture Garden (1986).

Gehry has previously collaborated with luxury jewelry company Tiffany & Co., creating six distinct jewelry collections: the Orchid, Fish, Torque, Equus, Axis, and Fold collections. In addition to jewelry, Gehry designed other items, including a distinctive collector's chess set and a series of tableware items, including vases, cups, and bowls for the company.

In 2004, Gehry designed the official trophy for the World Cup of Hockey. He redesigned the trophy for the next tournament in 2016.

He has collaborated with American furniture manufacturer Emeco on designs such as the 2004 "Superlight" chair.

In 2014, Gehry was one of the six "iconoclasts" selected by French fashion house Louis Vuitton to design a piece using their iconic monogram pattern as part of their "Celebrating Monogram" campaign.

In 2015, Gehry designed his first yacht.

In 2020, Gehry designed a limited edition bottle of Hennessy cognac.

Software development
Gehry's firm was responsible for innovation in architectural software. His firm spun off another firm called Gehry Technologies that was established in 2002. In 2005, Gehry Technologies began a partnership with Dassault Systèmes to bring innovations from the aerospace and manufacturing world to AEC and developed Digital Project software, as well as GTeam software. In 2014, Gehry Technologies was acquired by software company Trimble Navigation. Its client list includes Diller Scofidio + Renfro, Herzog & de Meuron, Jean Nouvel, Coop Himmelb(l)au, and Zaha Hadid.

Personal life
In 1954, Gehry changed his surname from Goldberg to Gehry, after his then-wife Anita expressed concern about anti-Semitism.

Having grown up in Canada, Gehry is an avid fan of ice hockey. He began a hockey league, FOG (for Frank Owen Gehry) in his office, though he no longer plays with them. In 2004, he designed the trophy for the World Cup of Hockey. A naturalized U.S. citizen, he also remains a citizen of Canada. He lives in Santa Monica, California, and continues to practice out of Los Angeles.

Gehry is known for his sometimes cantankerous personality. During a trip to Oviedo, Spain to accept the Prince of Asturias Award in October 2014, he received a significant amount of attention, both positive and negative, for publicly flipping off a reporter at a press conference who accused him of being a "showy" architect.

Gehry is a member of the California Yacht Club in Marina Del Rey, and enjoys sailing with his fiberglass-hulled yacht, Foggy. He also serves on the leadership council of The New York Stem Cell Foundation.

In popular culture
In 2004, Gehry voiced himself on the children's TV show Arthur, where he helped Arthur and his friends design a new treehouse. He also voiced himself in a 2005 episode of The Simpsons, "The Seven-Beer Snitch", where he designs a concert hall for the fictional city of Springfield. He has since said he regrets the appearance, as it included a joke about his design technique that has led people to misunderstand his architectural process.

In 2006, filmmaker Sydney Pollack made a documentary about Gehry's work, Sketches of Frank Gehry, which followed Gehry over five years and painted a positive portrait of his character; it was well-received critically.

In 2009, architecture-inspired ice cream sandwich company Coolhaus named a cookie and ice cream combination after Gehry. Dubbed the "Frank Behry", it features Strawberries & Cream gelato and snickerdoodle cookies.

Works

Exhibitions
In October 2014, the first major European exhibition of Gehry's work debuted at the Centre Pompidou in Paris. Other museums and major galleries that have held exhibitions on Gehry's architecture and design include the Leo Castelli Gallery in 1983; and the Walker Art Center in 1986, whose exhibition then traveled to the Toronto Harbourfront Museum, the Contemporary Arts Museum Houston, the High Museum of Art in Atlanta, the LACMA and the Whitney Museum. Museums with exhibitions on Gehry's work have included the Philadelphia Museum of Art, the Museum of Modern Art (1992), the Gagosian Gallery (1984, 1992 and 1993), the Solomon R. Guggenheim Museum (2001), the Guggenheim Bilbao (2002), the Jewish Museum in Manhattan (2010), and the Milan Triennale (first in 1988, then in 2010 with an exhibition entitled "Frank Gehry from 1997"), and LACMA (2015).

Gehry participated in the 1980 Venice Biennale's La Strada Novissima installation. He also contributed to the 1985 Venice Biennale with an installation and performance named Il Corso del Coltello, in collaboration with Claes Oldenburg. His projects were featured in the 1996 event, and contributed to the 2008 event with the installation Ungapatchket.

In October 2015, 21 21 Design Sight in Tokyo held the exhibition Frank Gehry. I Have An Idea, curated by Japanese architect Tsuyoshi Tane.

In 2021, the Gagosian Gallery in Beverly Hills held Spinning Tales, an exhibition of new fish sculptures by Gehry.

Awards and honors
 1987: Fellow of American Academy of Arts and Letters
 1988: Elected into the National Academy of Design
 1989: Pritzker Architecture Prize
 1992: Praemium Imperiale
 1994: The Dorothy and Lillian Gish Prize
 1995: American Academy of Achievement's Golden Plate Award
 1998: National Medal of Arts
 1998: Gold Medal Award, Royal Architectural Institute of Canada
 1999: AIA Gold Medal, American Institute of Architects
 2000: Cooper–Hewitt National Design Award Lifetime Achievement
 2002: Companion of the Order of Canada
 2004: Woodrow Wilson Award for Public Service
 2006: Inductee, California Hall of Fame
 2007: Henry C. Turner Prize for Innovation in Construction Technology from the National Building Museum (on behalf of Gehry Partners and Gehry Technologies)
 2009: Order of Charlemagne
 2012: Twenty-five Year Award, American Institute of Architects
 2014: Prince of Asturias Award
 2014: Commandeur of the Ordre National de la Légion d'honneur, France
 2015: J. Paul Getty Medal
 2016: Harvard Arts Medal
 2016: Leonore and Walter Annenberg Award for Diplomacy through the Arts, Foundation for Arts and Preservation in Embassies
 2016: Presidential Medal of Freedom
 2018: Neutra Medal
 2019: Inductee, Canada's Walk of Fame
2020: Paez Medal of Art, New York City (VAEA).

Gehry was elected to the College of Fellows of the American Institute of Architects (AIA) in 1974, and he has received many national, regional and local AIA awards. He is a senior fellow of the Design Futures Council and serves on the steering committee of the Aga Khan Award for Architecture.

Honorary doctorates
 1987: California Institute of the Arts
 1987: Rhode Island School of Design
 1989: Otis College of Art and Design
 1989: Technical University of Nova Scotia
 1993: Occidental College
 1995: Whittier College
 1998: University of Toronto
 2000: Harvard University
 2000: University of Edinburgh
 2000: University of Southern California
 2000: Yale University
 2002: City College of New York
 2004: School of the Art Institute of Chicago
 2013: Case Western Reserve University
 2013: Princeton University
 2014: Juilliard School
 2015: University of Technology Sydney
 2017: University of Oxford
 2019: Southern California Institute of Architecture

See also

 Contemporary architecture
 Organization of the artist
 Thin-shell structure

References
Notes

Bibliography 
 
 
 
 Rattenbury, Kester (2006). Architects Today Laurence King Publishers. .
 Staff (1995). "Frank Gehry 1991-1995". El Croquis.

Further reading 
  .

External links

 Gehry Partners, LLP, Gehry's architecture firm
 Gehry Technologies, Inc., Gehry's technology firm
 
 
 
 
 
 Fish Forms: Lamps by Frank Gehry Exhibition (2010) at The Jewish Museum (New York)
 STORIES OF HOUSES: Frank Gehry's House in California
 Bidding for the National Art Museum of China’s new site
 Gehry Draws on Violette Editions
 Frank Gehry architecture on Google Maps

1929 births
Architects from Los Angeles
Art in Greater Los Angeles
20th-century Canadian architects
Canadian furniture designers
Canadian emigrants to the United States
Canadian male voice actors
Canadian Jews
Canadian people of Polish-Jewish descent
Columbia University faculty
Companions of the Order of Canada
Deconstructivism
Harvard Graduate School of Design alumni
Jewish architects
Jewish American artists
Living people
Members of the European Academy of Sciences and Arts
National Design Award winners
Organic architecture
People from Toronto
Postmodern architects
Pritzker Architecture Prize winners
Recipients of the Praemium Imperiale
Recipients of the Royal Gold Medal
United States Army soldiers
United States National Medal of Arts recipients
USC School of Architecture alumni
Wolf Prize in Arts laureates
Yale School of Architecture faculty
People associated with the Philadelphia Museum of Art
Presidential Medal of Freedom recipients
Honorary Members of the Royal Academy
American people of Polish-Jewish descent
20th-century American architects
21st-century American architects
21st-century Canadian architects
American furniture designers
American male voice actors
21st-century American Jews
Recipients of the AIA Gold Medal